The Dalai Lama Center for Peace and Education is an international charitable organization and education center located in Vancouver, British Columbia, Canada.  Established in 2005, the center describes its mission as "educate the hearts of children by informing, inspiring and engaging the communities around them".

The organization is advised by several prominent leaders involved in peace-making and has organized events centered on discussions of spirituality, climate change, the environment, peace and other topics.

History and mission
The 14th Dalai Lama's ties with Vancouver, Canada, date from the early 1960s when Vancouver-based writer George Woodcock traveled to India to support Tibetan exiles and met the Dalai Lama.  Over the years, the Dalai Lama visited Vancouver several times, in 1980, 1993, 2004, 2006 and 2009.  The Dalai Lama's brother, Tendzin Choegyal, also has close ties with the city, having traveled there often to give speeches and teach.

Victor Chan, a 30-year friend of the Dalai Lama, is founding director of the center.  Chan co-authored a book with the Dalai Lama called, The Wisdom of Forgiveness. According to the Dalai Lama, Vancouver was chosen as the center's location because it is "multiethnic and multiracial population gives it harmony."

The center was formally inaugurated in September 2006 in Vancouver.  The Dalai Lama, in attendance at the event, was awarded honorary Canadian citizenship by the government of Canada.  Also attending the inauguration were Tim Shriver, Deepak Chopra, and Sonja Lyubomirsky.  James Hoggan & Associates provided public relations services for the event. Given Vancouver’s high profile positioning with the Dalai Lama, event organizers elected to widen the scope of his visit to the city and expand the audience for the Vancouver Dialogues by streaming sessions live, worldwide over the internet.

The center originally announced its intention to have a permanent facility constructed by 2009.  In a 2006 interview with the Vancouver Sun, Chan explained that the center's facility would be 4,645 square meters and include an outdoor European-style piazza, Zen garden, bookstore, film-screening theater, performing arts theater, art gallery, library, and studios for classes or group discussions.  Chan stated that the facility would highlight the Dalai Lama's international connections, invite guest speakers, host interfaith dialogues, and hold discussions on peaceful resolutions to conflicts.  Chan added that half of the center's $60 million budget would go to operating costs, research, local programming, and an endowment, and the rest towards construction of the facility and a meditative retreat.  As of March 2010, however, the center's website indicated that the organization had yet to construct a physical facility.

In a press release, the organization stated that its goals were to,

The Center added that it hopes to achieve this goal by promoting human values and stressing a sense of oneness with humanity.

Governance
The Center has an international advisory board which is chaired by the Dalai Lama and includes:
 Betty Williams
 Desmond Tutu
 Jimmy Carter
 Jody Williams
 Kim Campbell
 Mairead Maguire
 Sakyong Mipham
 Rigoberta Menchú Tum
 Shirin Ebadi
 Tendzin Choegyal

The Center is overseen by six trustees, including:
 Victor Chan
 Maureen Dockendor
 Mary McNeil
 Stephanie Korour
 Gloria Macarenko

Notable events
In October 2006 the Center hosted an invitation-only discussion group with economist John Helliwell and neuro-physiologist Richard Davidson.  The discussion centered on happiness.

Vancouver Peace Summit

The Center sponsored a summit in Vancouver in September 2009, called "The Vancouver Peace Summit".  In various dialogues, including "World Peace through Personal Peace", "Nobel Laureates in Dialogue", and "Educating the Heart", speakers discussed spirituality, science, psychotherapy, the arts, business, and education.  In attendance at the Summit were the Dalai Lama, Maria Shriver, Matthieu Ricard, Mary Robinson, Eckhart Tolle, Stephen Covey, Mairead Maguire, Betty Williams, Jody Williams, Murray Gell-Mann, and the Blue Man Group.  The event was held at the Chan Centre for the Performing Arts and the Orpheum and was attended by 5,000 people.

Be The Village. Dialogues with the Dalai Lama. Vancouver 2014

The Dalai Lama returned to Vancouver in October 2014 to take part in a panel discussion with Kimberly Schonert-Reichl, Tamara Vrooman and Janet Austen, with special guest Peter Senge. The focus of the discussion was the advancement of Heart-Mind well-being in children and youth.

Speaker Series

Since its creation in 2005, the Dalai Lama Center for Peace and Education (DLC) has hosted a number of events.  One of the Center’s programs is the Speakers Series, focusing on areas of interest to the Dalai Lama and the Center. These include science and its relationship to spirituality, education of the heart and related research, and the development of compassion and its contribution to the public good. Public events are held throughout the year.

In June 2010 the Speakers Series guests included John Helliwell, UBC Professor Emeritus of Economics and Officer of the Order of Canada; Elizabeth Dunn, assistant professor in the UBC Department of Psychology; and Bill Harbaugh, economics professor at the University of Oregon, for a discussion on “Money, Generosity and Happiness.” The panelists presented their latest research from economics, social psychology and neuroscience. They discussed altruism, charitable giving, and factors that promote well-being and happiness in individuals and society.

In March Jody Williams gave an intimate talk about the work of herself and her colleagues to ban landmines, recognized by the Nobel Peace Prize. Williams also spoke promoting human rights through the work of the Nobel Women’s Initiative.
 
Earlier that month psychologist Paul Ekman made a presentation on “Darwin, the Dalai Lama and the Nature of Compassion.”

Throughout 2007–2009, the Speakers Series hosted Marc Brackett, Arthur Zajonc, Daniel Goleman, Robert Putnam, Stephen G. Post, Reginald Ray, Daniel Siegel, and Richard Davidson.
 
The DLC often co-sponsors events with other organizations, such as the Vancouver Board of Trade and Hollyhock Foundation.

References

External links
 Dalai Lama Center for Peace and Education official website
 Vancouver Peace Summit, 2009

Charities based in Canada
Educational charities
International charities
Organizations based in Vancouver
Organizations established in 2005
14th Dalai Lama